Bela Church, also Our Lady of Sorrows Church, is a Roman Catholic church in the Kasargode district of Kerala state, South India, 15 km north of Kasaragod, and 50km away from Mangalore.

It was built in 1890; thus, it is the oldest church in the district. This Gothic Revival Roman Catholic church, which is under the Manglore Diocese, has recently celebrated its centenary. It has also undergone renovations.

See also 
 Our Lady of Sorrows

Sources and external links 
 Bela Church website

Roman Catholic churches in Kerala
Churches in Kasaragod district
Roman Catholic churches completed in 1890
1890 establishments in India
Tourist attractions in Kasaragod district
19th-century Roman Catholic church buildings in India